Književna reč was a literary magazine that was published first in Yugoslavia, and then in Serbia from 1972 to 2004. It had a significant influence on Yugoslav literary and cultural scene, especially during 1980s. The magazine was publishing leading authors of the period, and also bringing literary news from the country and abroad.

References

External links
 Official website on the Internet Archive

1972 establishments in Yugoslavia
2004 disestablishments in Serbia
Defunct literary magazines published in Europe
Defunct magazines published in Serbia
Magazines established in 1972
Magazines disestablished in 2004
Magazines published in Yugoslavia
Literary magazines published in Serbia
Literary magazines published in Yugoslavia